Boštjanov let is a novel by Slovenian author Florjan Lipuš. It was first published in 2003.

See also
List of Slovenian novels

References 

Slovenian novels
2003 novels